ToyVoyagers are travelling toys which get around by being passed from person to person. Their travels and adventures are tracked on a website.

Each ToyVoyager carries a unique identification number on a tag.   A message on the tag encourages anyone who comes into contact with it to go to the website and update its Travelog, including photographs of where it has been.  To continue its journey, the ToyVoyager is then either passed on to somebody else directly or released into the wild for somebody to find – this is known as a Wild Release.

History
Taking inspiration from the travelling gnome in the film Amélie,   the project was created to see if it would be possible for toys to travel 'by themselves'. The aim was for the toys to become travel companions – able to go places, do things, meet people and have their adventures captured in photographs.  With more than five thousand people from all over the world, have joined the project and it has become an international community in its own right.  More than three thousand ToyVoyagers have been created and sent on their travels since the website began. Along with this, this hobby was created to replicate toys having their own mind and being able to move by themselves. The toys used have been rescued, new, or forgotten.

Hosts
Many members of the website make themselves available as hosts, offering ToyVoyagers a place to stay.  The ToyVoyagers travel by post from host to host and at each stop they are shown around and updates are made to their travelogs with stories and photographs about their adventures.  Sending a ToyVoyager to an established Host is generally seen as a safer way to travel than the wild release. The toy owners can also put requests for places on their toy profile. This means that the host that gets the toy is requested to go to these places and take pictures of it there. Hosts can also send your toy to another host or back to you after their time with it is over. Overall, the price of this hobby is fairly cheap since the only cost is shipping.

Statistics
There are 6,716 members that take part in this activity across the world. Those people live in 148 different countries. Overall, the geographic distribution is fairly even. Along with this, ToyVoyagers have traveled to 115 countries. Some examples of the countries that participate in this hobby are Australia, Switzerland, China, Germany, and the United States.

See also 
 Geocoin
 Geokrety
 Travel Bug

References

External links 
Official site
Flickr ToyVoyagers Group

Internet object tracking